Nshkhark is an abandoned village in the Martuni Municipality of the Gegharkunik Province of Armenia.

References

Former populated places in Gegharkunik Province